"Weekend" is a song recorded by Eddie Cochran. The song was written by Bill and Doree Post and recorded in April 1959.

Background
The song was released posthumously as a single in the UK on London Records as 45-HLG 9362 in June 1961 and rose to number 15 on the charts. In the US it was released on Liberty Records as 55389 in December 1961 and did not chart. The song was published by Cross Music in the UK. This was the last single with original material by Eddie Cochran released in the US.

Personnel
 Eddie Cochran - vocals, guitar
 Conrad "Guybo" Smith or Dave Shriver - electric bass
 Gene Riggio - drums

Chart performance

Cover versions
The song was covered in 1968 by The Move and appears on their eponymous album. The song was also recorded by Bobby Vee in 1965, Showaddywaddy in 1981, Alvin Stardust in 1982, Teenage Head in 1985, and Darrel Higham in 2004.

References

External links

 Eddie Cochran US discography

Eddie Cochran songs
Liberty Records singles
1959 songs